The Cathedral of the Assumption of the Blessed Virgin Mary  also called Assumption Cathedral is the name given to a religious building affiliated with the Roman Catholic Church and is located in the city of Kharkiv, in Kharkiv Oblast in east part of the European country of Ukraine. The temple was built in neo-Gothic style between 1887 and 1892 on Gogol Street. The author of the temple project was a Polish architect, Bolesław Michałowski (1830-1909). He designed about 30 buildings in Kharkiv.

In the thirties of the twentieth century, during the period of the Soviet Union the church was closed and turned into secular Local housed, among others, a cinema and an installation of the Communist Party. In 1992 the temple was returned to the Catholic faithful. Since 2002 is the cathedral of the new diocese of Kharkiv - Zaporizhzhia (Dioecesis Kharkiviensis-Zaporizhiensis, Харківсько-Запорізька дієцезія) that was created by bull "Ad plenius prospiciendum" of Pope John Paul II.

See also
Roman Catholicism in Ukraine
Cathedral of the Assumption of the Blessed Virgin Mary

References

Roman Catholic cathedrals in Ukraine
Religious buildings and structures in Kharkiv
Roman Catholic churches completed in 1892
Gothic Revival church buildings in Ukraine
19th-century Roman Catholic church buildings in Ukraine